Richard David Davis (1799June 17, 1871) was an American lawyer and politician who served two terms as a U.S. Representative from New York from 1841 to 1845.

Biography 
Born at Stillwater, New York, Davis graduated from Yale College in 1818.
He studied law.
He was admitted to the bar in 1821 and commenced practice in Poughkeepsie.

Tenure in Congress 
Davis was elected as a Democrat to the Twenty-seventh and Twenty-eighth Congresses (March 4, 1841 – March 4, 1845).
He served as chairman of the Committee on Revolutionary Claims (Twenty-eighth Congress).
He was not a candidate for renomination in 1844.
Withdrew from political and professional life.

Later career and death 
He engaged in agricultural pursuits in Waterford, New York, where he died on June 17, 1871.
He was interred in Waterford Rural Cemetery.

References

1799 births
1871 deaths
Yale College alumni
Democratic Party members of the United States House of Representatives from New York (state)
19th-century American politicians